The Three Outcasts is a 1929 American silent Western film directed by Clifford Smith and starring Yakima Canutt, Pete Morrison and Gertrude Short.

Cast
 Yakima Canutt as Dick Marsh
 Pete Morrison as Bruce Slavin
 Gertrude Short as June
 Lew Short as Rance Slavin
 Frank Jennings as Sheriff
 Maurice Murphy as Dick Marsh - as a boy
 Florence Midgley as Mrs. Slaviin
 Whitehorse as Nels Nolan

References

Bibliography
 Langman, Larry. A Guide to Silent Westerns. Greenwood Publishing Group, 1992.

External links
 

1929 films
1929 Western (genre) films
American black-and-white films
Films directed by Clifford Smith
Silent American Western (genre) films
1920s English-language films
1920s American films